The Toreo de Cuatro Caminos (literally: Four Roads Bullring; also nicknamed El Coloso de Naucalpan) was a bullring that existed in the limits of Miguel Hidalgo, Mexico City and the municipality of Naucalpan de Juárez, State of Mexico, being an important point of reference on the limits between these two entities for motorists of the Anillo Periférico, a highway adjacent to the site. Since 2008, the Toreo Parque Central shopping center has been located on its site. Even after its demolition, the area where the bullring stood is commonly known as Toreo or Toreo de Cuatro Caminos.

References

Further reading
 "Los últimos trozos del coloso" — El Universal.

Bullrings in Mexico
Naucalpan de Juárez
Buildings and structures completed in 1907
Buildings and structures completed in 1947
Demolished buildings and structures in Mexico
Sports venues demolished in 2008
2008 disestablishments in Mexico